WAXJ (103.5 FM) is a radio station licensed to serve Frederiksted, U.S. Virgin Islands. The station is owned by Reef Broadcasting, Inc.  It airs an Urban AC and Reggae format.

The station has been assigned these call letters by the Federal Communications Commission since January 23, 1998.

Programming
In addition to its regular programming, this station airs the "dLife Diabetes Minute" health advisory program.

References

External links
 WAXJ official website
 
 
 

AXJ
Urban adult contemporary radio stations in the United States
Radio stations established in 1998
1998 establishments in the United States Virgin Islands
Saint Croix, U.S. Virgin Islands
Reggae, soca and calypso radio stations
Adult contemporary radio stations in insular areas of the United States